Artistic gymnastics events were held at the 2019 African Games from 26 to 29 August 2019 in Rabat, Morocco.

Participating nations

Medal table

Medal summary

Men

Women

References

External links
Results
Results book

2019 African Games
African Games
2019 African Games
2019